Pudhea Paadhai is a 1989 Indian Tamil-language drama film written and directed by R. Parthiban in his directorial debut. The film stars himself as an inhumane ruffian who gets reformed by his rape victim (Seetha), while V. K. Ramasamy, Manorama, Nassar, Sridhar, Kuyili and Sathyapriya appear in supporting roles.

Pudhea Paadhai was released on 14 April 1989 and emerged a box-office success, while also winning several accolades including two National Film Awards, and two Tamil Nadu State Film Awards. It was remade in Kannada in 1990 as Hosa Jeevana, in Hindi in 1991 as Benaam Badsha, in 1991 in Telugu as Rowdy Gaari Pellam and in 1996 in Malayalam as Swarnakireedam.

Plot 
An unnamed orphan who was abandoned in the garbage soon after his birth, grows up to be a ruffian who does anything for money. On one occasion, he rapes Seetha, a bride-to-be, on the eve of her wedding at the instruction of Annapoorani, who Seetha had earlier exposed for her malpractices in running an orphanage and got her arrested. Though the sympathetic bridegroom offers to marry Seetha, she declines his offer. Instead, she takes residence in the house of Aaya, who lives in the same slum as the ruffian. She attempts to develop the ruffian's acquaintance, much to everyone's disbelief. Their constant confrontations bring about a chemistry in their relationship. She narrates to the people in the area that he molested her and the sequences which forced her to leave her father and live in the slum. They sympathise with her and everyone feels that the ruffian has to accept her as he is responsible for her present pitiable condition. Consequently, Seetha moves into his house. Her tender love and affection eventually leads to their marriage. Seetha advises him to shed the path of violence and reform himself. He is named Seetharaman.

Seetharaman slowly changes and tries to work hard in a righteous way to run his family. Seetha later gives birth to his son. However, Seetharaman's past sins do not spare him. Thoguthi, for whom Seetharaman previously worked, kills Annapoorani when she demands her share from his illegal gains. Seetharaman is arrested as he was working for Thoguthi earlier. To get exonerated, he is forced to become an approver and report Thoguthi's activities. Thoguthi decides to kill Seetharaman to halt his appearance in court. He plants a bomb in a lunchbox (identical to the one sent by Seetha to Seetharaman) and replaces it with the original. The bomb is planted in such a way that it would explode immediately when the lunchbox is opened. Seetharaman, busy working for extra money to buy a gift for Seetha and their wedding anniversary, does not have lunch. He returns with the lunchbox and leaves to visit the temple with Seetha. When Seetha returns home to take her child's feeding bottle which she had forgotten, she opens the lunchbox out of curiosity, expecting a gift from her husband, and dies in the ensuing explosion. Enraged, Seetharaman attacks and almost kills Thoguthi, but his child's cries remind him of his responsibilities, so he spares Thoguthi's life. Thoguthi chases Seetharaman, but is struck to death by a vehicle. Seetharaman leaves with his child and brings him up.

Cast 
 R. Parthiban as Seetharaman
 Seetha as Seetha
 V. K. Ramasamy
 Manorama as Aaya
 Nassar as Thoguthi
 Sridhar as Doctor
 Kuyili as Kuyili
 Sathyapriya as Annapoorani
 Vennira Aadai Moorthy
 Idichapuli Selvaraj

Production 

Parthiban, an erstwhile assistant of K. Bhagyaraj made his directorial debut with this film. The film was initially titled as Kelvikkuri with Babji of Hemnag films producing it. However, after shooting for three days, it was stopped. Babji advised Parthiban to tell the story to A. Sundaram, a popular distributor. Sundaram liked the script and decided to produce the film. They went to Rajinikanth, who suggested Parthiban to play the hero. Though Parthiban was keen on choosing another actor (Arjun or Sathyaraj) for the leading role, Sundaram wanted him to play the role considering what Rajinikanth said and the budget. Sundaram wanted a different title, he then selected Pudhea Paadhai from the 50 titles shortlisted. The film was made on a budget of ₹38 lakh (worth ₹11 crore in 2021 prices) and filming was completed within 50 days. Parthiban initially approached Khushbu to portray the lead actress, but the producer did not accept as she was not fluent in Tamil at the time; the role went to Seetha. Cinematography was handled by A. Rajpreet, and editing by M. N. Raja.

Soundtrack 
The soundtrack was composed by Chandrabose, and all songs were penned by Vairamuthu.

Release and reception 
Pudhea Paadhai was released on 14 April 1989, Puthandu. Despite facing competition from other Puthandu releases such as Apoorva Sagodharargal, En Rathathin Rathame and Pillaikkaga, the film became a commercial success. P. S. S. of Kalki positively reviewed the film, particularly for Parthiban and Chandrabose.

Accolades

Remakes

References

Bibliography

External links 
 

1980s Tamil-language films
1989 directorial debut films
1989 drama films
1989 films
Best Tamil Feature Film National Film Award winners
Films about orphans
Films about rape in India
Films directed by R. Parthiban
Films featuring a Best Supporting Actress National Film Award-winning performance
Films scored by Chandrabose (composer)
Indian drama films
Tamil films remade in other languages